Urban Search and Rescue Florida Task Force 2 or FL-TF2 is a FEMA Urban Search and Rescue Task Force based in Miami, Florida and sponsored by the Miami Fire Department. FL-TF2 was started in 1991 and is designed to respond to a variety of disasters, including earthquakes, hurricanes, and terrorist attacks. The Miami Fire Department sponsors the team, and provides administrative staff as well as warehouse space and other infrastructure needs. The team is composed of experts from 23 additional fire and police departments as well as civilians making up the 210 members of the team.

Deployments 
 1995 - Hurricane Opal
 1996 - Humberto Vidal explosion in Río Piedras, Puerto Rico
 1998 - Papua New Guinea earthquake
 1999 - Hurricane Floyd
 2001 - World Trade Center
 2003 - Space Shuttle Columbia disaster
 2004 - Hurricane Charley
 2004 - Hurricane Frances
 2005 - Hurricane Katrina
 2005 - Hurricane Katrina
 2010 - Haiti earthquake
2021 - Surfside Condominium Collapse in Surfside, Florida

References

Florida 2
Miami